John Devine may refer to:

Sports
 John Devine (footballer, born 1933), English footballer
 John Devine (footballer, born 1935), Scottish footballer
 John Devine (footballer, born 1958), Irish footballer
 John Devine (footballer, born 1969), Northern Irish footballer
 John Devine (Scottish footballer), Scottish footballer
 John Devine (Australian rules footballer) (1940–2023), Australian footballer and politician
 John Devine (Gaelic footballer) (born 1983), Irish Gaelic footballer
 John Devine (jockey) who rode in the 1836 &  1837 Great Liverpool Steeplechases
 Johnny Devine, Canadian wrestler
 John Devine (cyclist) (born 1985), American racing cyclist

Other people
 John C. Devine, Arizona politician
 John P. Devine (politician), Illinois politician
 John P. Devine (judge), Texas Supreme Court judge
 John M. Devine, United States Army general